John Ruggles (born 12 April 1934) is a British sailor. He competed in the 5.5 Metre event at the 1960 Summer Olympics.

References

External links
 

1934 births
Living people
British male sailors (sport)
Olympic sailors of Great Britain
Sailors at the 1960 Summer Olympics – 5.5 Metre
Sportspeople from London